Barnebya is a genus in the Malpighiaceae, a family of about 75 genera of flowering plants in the order Malpighiales. Barnebya comprises 2 species of trees and woody vines native to eastern Brazil. The genus is named in honor of the American botanist Rupert Charles Barneby (1911–2006).

References and external links

 Barnebya
 Malpighiaceae Malpighiaceae - description, taxonomy, phylogeny, and nomenclature
 Anderson, W. R., and B. Gates. 1981. Barnebya, a new genus of Malpighiaceae from Brazil. Brittonia 33: 275–284. 1981.

Malpighiaceae
Malpighiaceae genera